Ilgar Nabiyev (born 27 May 1987) is an Azerbaijani football defender who plays for TKİ Tavşanlı Linyitspor.

References

External links

Azerbaijani footballers
Azerbaijani expatriate footballers
1987 births
Living people
TFF First League players
Association football defenders